The 1917 Idaho football team represented the University of Idaho in the 1917 college football season. Idaho was led by second-year head coach Wilfred C. Bleamaster and played as an independent; they joined the Pacific Coast Conference five years later  Idaho had two home games in Moscow on campus at MacLean Field, with none in Boise.

Idaho dropped a fourth consecutive shutout to Washington State in the Battle of the Palouse, falling   Six years later, the Vandals won the first of three consecutive, their only three-peat in the rivalry series.

Idaho opened with three losses, then won twice for a  record; they did not play Gonzaga this season.

Schedule

 The Little Brown Stein trophy for the Montana game debuted 21 years later in 1938
 One game was played on Thursday (against Montana in Missoula on Thanksgiving)

1918
The following year in 1918, Idaho's football team was non-varsity, composed of Student Army Training Corps (SATC)  After the Armistice ending World War I, they played a limited schedule and defeated Washington State's SATC team 7–6 in Moscow in December.

Idaho's first two games were against Gonzaga; the opener in Moscow on November 16 was a 13–7 Idaho win, and they tied the next week in Spokane at seven points each. Idaho played another in Spokane on November 30, a 0–68 loss to a team of U.S. Marines from Mare Island Naval Shipyard in

References

External links
 Gem of the Mountains: 1919 University of Idaho yearbook (spring 1918) – 1917 football season
 Go Mighty Vandals – 1917 football season
 Official game program: Washington State at Idaho – November 3, 1917
 Idaho Argonaut – student newspaper – 1917 editions

Idaho
Idaho Vandals football seasons
Idaho football